The National Progressive Party was a political party in Zambia led by John Roberts.

History
The party was established in April 1963 as a Northern Rhodesian successor to the United Federal Party. It won all 10 seats reserved for Europeans in the 1964 general elections. However, with the reserved seats due to be abolished before the 1968 elections, the party dissolved itself in August 1966, with its MPs sitting as independents until the end of the terms.

References

Defunct political parties in Zambia
1963 establishments in Northern Rhodesia
Political parties established in 1963
Political parties disestablished in 1966
1966 disestablishments in Zambia
Liberal parties in Africa